George Alain Frecker, OC (June 29, 1905 – September 30, 1979) was a Canadian politician and academic administrator.

Early life
Frecker was the son of George and Suzanna Frecker. He was born in St. Pierre in 1905 and moved to Halifax, Nova Scotia at the age of 13. He completed a B.Sc. in Electrical Engineering from the Nova Scotia Technical College in 1932 and a B.A. From Saint Mary's University in 1933.

Career
Frecker moved to St. John's, Newfoundland in 1934 as the head of the Engineering Department at Memorial University of Newfoundland. He served as the Secretary of Education and the Deputy Minister of Education from 1944 to 1959. In 1959 he resigned as the Deputy Minister of Education to become the MHA for the District of Placentia East, a position he held until 1971. During his time as MHA he served as the Minister of Education from 1959 to 1964 and the Minister of Provincial Affairs from 1964 to 1971.

He was the Chancellor of Memorial University of Newfoundland from 1972 to 1979. In 1972 he was presented with the Order of Canada medal of service for "excellence in all fields of endeavour in Canadian life". During his life he was awarded honorary degrees from St. Francis Xavier University, St. Mary's University, Memorial University, Laval University and the University of Montreal.

Family
He married Helena Mary McGrath; the couple had eight children.

Death
Frecker died at the age of 74. After his death the Memorial University Campus in St. Pierre was renamed l'Institut Frecker and a French choir in St. John's was renamed Chorale Frecker in his honour.

Footnotes

1905 births
1979 deaths
Canadian people of Saint Pierre and Miquelon descent
People from Saint Pierre and Miquelon
Members of the Newfoundland and Labrador House of Assembly
French emigrants to Canada
Officers of the Order of Canada
Government ministers of the Dominion of Newfoundland
Members of the Executive Council of Newfoundland and Labrador